Kansanshi mine is a large copper and gold mine located in Solwezi in the North-Western Province of Zambia. The mine is approximately 14 kilometers north the town of Solwezi. Kansanshi is one of the largest copper reserves in Zambia, with estimated reserves of 727 million tonnes of ore graded at 0.86% copper.

It is owned by First Quantum Minerals (FQM) (80%) and ZCCM Investments Holdings (20%). The mine is operated by Kansanshi Mining Plc.

In May 2022, First Quantum approved a US$ 1.25 billion expansion of the mine following the host government's commitment to a predictable investing environment.

In August 2022, FQM reported a 5.2% decline in Quarter on Quarter (QOQ) copper production at Kansanshi Mine. This was a decrease of 2,180 tonnes to result in copper production of 39,719 tonnes.

See also 

 Mining in Zambia
 Economy of Zambia

References 

Copper mines in Zambia
Solwezi
Solwezi District